"Flow" is a song by Australian singer Casey Donovan. The song was released in July 2005 as the third and final single from her debut studio album For You (2004). The song peaked at number 51 on the ARIA Charts.

Track listing
 "Flow" (single edit)	
 "Better to Love" 
 "Flow" (CD-ROM video)

Charts

References

2004 songs
2005 singles
Sony BMG singles
Casey Donovan (singer) songs
Songs written by Jimmy Harry